Craig Douglas Muni (born July 19, 1962) is a Canadian former professional ice hockey player who played 819 National Hockey League (NHL) games over the course of his career.

Playing career
As a youth, Muni played in the 1975 Quebec International Pee-Wee Hockey Tournament with a minor ice hockey team from Toronto.

Known as a defensive specialist, open ice hitter, penalty killer and a shot blocker, Muni won three Stanley Cups with the Edmonton Oilers in 1987, 1988, and 1990 and also played for the Chicago Blackhawks, Buffalo Sabres, Pittsburgh Penguins, Toronto Maple Leafs, Dallas Stars and Winnipeg Jets. He retired in 1998. He led the league three times in Plus Minus while a member of the Oilers.

Coaching career
On June 25, 2016, he was named the co-head coach of the NWHL's Buffalo Beauts, sharing duties with former NHL player Ric Seiling.

Career statistics

Awards and achievements
1986–87 - NHL - Stanley Cup (Edmonton)
1987–88 - NHL - Stanley Cup (Edmonton)
1989-90 - NHL - Stanley Cup (Edmonton)
2016-17 - NWHL - Isobel Cup (Buffalo)

References

External links

1962 births
Buffalo Sabres players
Chicago Blackhawks players
Cincinnati Tigers players
Dallas Stars players
Edmonton Oilers players
Kingston Canadians players
Living people
New Brunswick Hawks players
Pittsburgh Penguins players
St. Catharines Saints players
Stanley Cup champions
Ice hockey people from Toronto
Tampa Bay Lightning scouts
Toronto Maple Leafs draft picks
Toronto Maple Leafs players
Windsor Spitfires players
Winnipeg Jets (1979–1996) players
Canadian ice hockey defencemen